Shirley Jean Douglas  (April 2, 1934 – April 5, 2020) was a Canadian actress and activist. Her acting career combined with her family name made her recognizable in Canadian film, television and national politics.

Early life
Douglas was born April 2, 1934, in Weyburn, Saskatchewan, the daughter of Irma May (née Dempsey; 1911–95) and Tommy Douglas (1904–86), the late Scottish-born Canadian statesman, Premier of Saskatchewan and the first leader of the federal New Democratic Party. She attended high school at Central Collegiate Institute (now closed) in Regina. Douglas attended the Banff School of Fine Arts at the age of 16.

Career
Douglas's acting career began in 1950 with a role in the Regina Little Theatre entry at the Dominion Drama Festival, where she won the best actress award. In 1952 Shirley graduated from the Royal Academy of Dramatic Art in London and stayed in England for several years, performing for theatre and television, before returning to Canada in 1957.

She continued to act; and her career encompassed several memorable roles on stages in Canada, the United Kingdom and the United States. She portrayed prominent feminist Nellie McClung, family matriarch and business woman May Bailey in the television series Wind at My Back, Hagar Shipley in Margaret Laurence's The Stone Angel, and even characters in popular science fiction series like The Silver Surfer and Flash Gordon.

In 1997, Douglas appeared on stage with her son Kiefer Sutherland at the Royal Alexandra Theatre and at the National Arts Centre in The Glass Menagerie. In 2000, she performed on stage in The Vagina Monologues. In 2006, she portrayed former U.S. Secretary of State Madeleine Albright in the ABC mini-series The Path to 9/11.

In 2003, for her contributions to the performing arts, she was named an Officer of the Order of Canada.

Personal life and death
Douglas was the mother of three children: Thomas Emil Sicks from her marriage to Canadian prairie brewery heir Timothy Emil Sicks in 1957, and twins Rachel Sutherland and Kiefer Sutherland from her second marriage to Canadian actor Donald Sutherland (1966–70).

By 2009, Douglas was in a wheelchair due to a degenerative spine condition that caused her severe pain.

Douglas died on April 5, 2020, due to complications from pneumonia, three days after her 86th birthday.

Activism
Douglas moved to Los Angeles, California in 1967 after marrying actor Donald Sutherland. She became involved in the American Civil Rights Movement, the campaign against the Vietnam War, and later on behalf of immigrants and women. She helped establish the fundraising group "Friends of the Black Panthers".

In 1969, she was arrested in Los Angeles for Conspiracy to Possess Unregistered Explosives. According to a sworn statement by FBI agents, she allegedly attempted to purchase hand grenades for the Black Panthers using a cheque from those FBI agents. As her defence, she claimed the FBI was framing her by creating a crime where none existed prior to their involvement.

Subsequently, the FBI denied her a work permit based on this allegation. Douglas, by then divorced from Sutherland, left America in 1977. She and her three children moved to Toronto. The courts eventually dismissed the case and exonerated her.

Douglas co-founded the first chapter in Canada of the Performing Artists for Nuclear Disarmament.

As the daughter of Tommy Douglas, promoter of Medicare, she was one of Canada's activists in favour of tax-payer funded health-care instead of privatized care. In the 2006 Canadian federal election, Douglas campaigned on behalf of the federal New Democratic Party and in 2012 she supported Brian Topp for that party's leadership.

Filmography

Film

Television

Awards
 (2000) Gemini Award for her performance in the 1999 TV film Shadow Lake.
 (2001) Honorary degree of  Doctor of Laws (LL.D) from Ryerson University.
 (2000) "Diamond Award" for her volunteerism, by the Variety Club an international charity for children in need
 (2002) Queen Elizabeth II Golden Jubilee Medal  
 (2003) Officer of the Order of Canada (OC) - October 24, 2003.
 (2004) awarded a space on the Wall of Fame at the National Arts Centre in Ottawa
 (2004) received the "Distinguished Canadian Award" by the Seniors’ Education Centre at the University of Regina, an award first presented to her father almost 20 years before
 (2004) inducted with a star, on Canada's Walk of Fame in Toronto
 (2005) Honorary degree from Brandon University
 (2006) In November, Shirley gave an honorary lecture at Trent University
 (2009) Shirley Douglas was awarded the International Achievement Award at the 2009 Crystal Awards presented in Toronto by Women in Film & Television - Toronto, November 30, 2009
 (2012) Queen Elizabeth II Diamond Jubilee Medal Toronto, February 28, 2012

References

Citations

Sources

External links
Order of Canada Citation
Northern Stars

The Commonwealth Journal

1934 births
2020 deaths
Actresses from Saskatchewan
Canadian activists
Canadian film actresses
Canadian people of Scottish descent
Canadian stage actresses
Canadian television actresses
Canadian voice actresses
Best Supporting Actress in a Television Film or Miniseries Canadian Screen Award winners
Deaths from pneumonia in Ontario
Officers of the Order of Canada
People from Weyburn
20th-century Canadian actresses
21st-century Canadian actresses
Sutherland family
Alumni of RADA
Canadian women activists